Thaenmozhi B.A-Uratchi Mandra Thalaivar is a Tamil language drama airing on Star Vijay. It premiered on 26 August 2019 starring Jacqueline and Siddharth. It is the remake of Star Bharat Hindi series Nimki Mukhiya. The series was abruptly stopped since 4 January 2021 even though the story plot has not finished and later relaunched from 18 January 2021 replacing Bigg Boss Tamil.

Synopsis 
Thaenmozhi is a young, carefree girl who accidentally becomes the President (chief) of her village. She is then married to Arul, son of Devraj, the former chief of the village. Devraj's intention behind making Theanmozhi his daughter-in-law is fulfilling his own personal political ambitions. No one in Arul's family accepts Thaenmozhi except Devraj's mother (Arul's Grandmother),  Deivanai. Arul himself doesn't like Thenmozhi because of her immaturity.  Dheivanai loves Thaenmozhi and treats her well. Arul's family make Thaenmozhi live in a maid's room and treat her like a domestic help. Thaenmozhi believes that Devraj's family will love her one day.

Cast

Main
 Jacquline Lydia as Thenmozhi, Arul's wife.
 Siddharth Kumaran as Arulvel, Thenmozhi's husband
 Usha Elizabeth as Parameshwari aka Paramu, Arul's mother

Recurring
 Anjali Prabhakaran as Thamizhmadhi
Ashritha Sreedas replaced Anjali
 Naveen Vetri as Aravind
 Jeganathan as Devaraj, Arul's father
 P. R. Varalakshmi as Dheivanai, Arul's grandmother
 Sumangali replaced Varalakshmi
 VJ Archana as Devi, Arul's elder sister
 Manush Manmohan / jayaraman mohan as Nagaraj, Devi's husband
 Varun Udhay as Kanagavel, Arul's elder brother
 Stefy Remigius as Rekha, Kanagavel's wife
 Prabhakaran as Muthuvel, Arul's younger brother
 SK Karthick replaced Prabhakaran 
 Mohana as Arul's younger sister
 Britto as Maari, Arul's friend
 Ramesh (2019-2021)(dead) /Ravi shankar as Subbaiah, Thenmozhi's father
 Manukumar as Anbu, Thenmozhi's friend
 Adhil as Iniyan, Thenmozhi's younger brother
 Cumbum sellamuthu meena as Bhavani, Thenmozhi's aunt

References 

Star Vijay original programming
Tamil-language romance television series
2019 Tamil-language television series debuts
Tamil-language television shows
2021 Tamil-language television series endings
Tamil-language television series based on Hindi-language television series